Sarah M. Badel (born 30 March 1943) is a retired British stage and film actress. She is the daughter of actors Alan Badel and Yvonne Owen.

Life and career
Badel was born in London to actor, Alan Badel and actress, Yvonne Owen. She was educated in Poles Convent, Hertfordshire and trained for the stage at the Royal Academy of Dramatic Art; she is now an Associate Member.

Sarah Badel made her acting debut in January 1963 in the Bristol Old Vic company's production of Hamlet, which was then touring India. Her first appearance in London theatre came in October 1964 in the part of Bella Hedley in Robert and Elizabeth at the Lyric Theatre. Badel made her Broadway theatre debut the following October playing Helen in The Right Honourable Gentleman at the Billy Rose Theatre.

In 1966, she performed at the Chichester Festival Theatre in such roles as Miss Fanny in The Clandestine Marriage and Anya in The Cherry Orchard. She returned to the Chichester Festival in 1967 and again in 1970. Other venues at which Badel has performed include the National Theatre Company and St George's Playhouse in Islington. She is also involved in many radio projects including adaptations of A Moon for the Misbegotten, Mourning Becomes Electra, and Lucia in London.

Badel made her first film appearance in the 1970 British comedy Every Home Should Have One. Other films in which she has appeared include The Shooting Party in 1985 and Not Without My Daughter in 1991. Badel made her first appearance on television in 1962 portraying Perdita in a television adaptation of The Winter's Tale.

She played Flora Poste in Cold Comfort Farm (1968) and Lizzie Eustace in The Pallisers (1974). In the 1980 BBC Television Shakespeare production of The Taming of the Shrew she played the lead female role of Katherine opposite John Cleese as Petruchio. Badel also had a role as Sister Madgalen (Avice of Thornbury) in two episodes of the TV series Cadfael (1994–1998). Other television appearances include She Fell Among Thieves, The Irish R.M., the 1996 adaptation of The Tenant of Wildfell Hall, and Just Visiting in 2001.  She played Patricia Bradshaw in The Black Book, a 2009 episode of Midsomer Murders.

Filmography

Film

Television

Theatre

References

External links
 

1943 births
Alumni of RADA
Living people
English stage actresses
English film actresses
English television actresses
Actresses from London
People educated at Notting Hill & Ealing High School